Nyalikungu is a locality in Maswa District, Simiyu Region, Tanzania. It is inhabited by the Sukuma people.

Populated places in Simiyu Region